Zindagi Jalebi(Hindi: जिंदगी जलेबी) is a 2013 Bollywood comedy film directed by Karan Kashyyap.

Plot
Zindagi Jalebi  is a comedy based on the idea that idle minds are the devil's workshop. It also symbolises an innate need and tendency of every human to do a heroic deed and a desire to be remembered for it for times to come. If their ordinary lives and circumstances do not have a place for a heroic deed, then they want to manipulate and create one. The comedy is that those who set out for the task end up creating a hero out of somebody else and somehow come out of the series of events unscathed. Zindagi Jalebi is a story where everyone's life is jumbling up in a mess and then how they come out of this mess.

Cast
Film stars Avinash Bhargava, Leena, Samarth Chaturvedi, Suresh Dubey and Urvashi Solanki  as Gunjan bai (Item Number/Dance)

 Avinash Bhargava as Pritam
 Leena as Pyari                        
 Samarth Chaturvedi as Rakku Bhaiyya
 Suresh Dubey as Inspector
 Urvashi Solanki as Gunjan bai (Item number)

Crew
The film was written and directed by Karan Kashyap, while it was produced by Kanti Chheda of Moksh Films Production.  The movie released on 6 September 2013.

Soundtrack

References

External links
 

Indian comedy films
2013 films
2010s Hindi-language films
2013 comedy films
Hindi-language comedy films